Siemens is the name of a family of German technology and telecommunications industrialists, founders and to the present day largest shareholders of Siemens AG. The family have a wealth of over €8 billion, making them the 5th richest family in Germany, according to Handelsblatt.

History

Origin 
The Siemens family was first documented in 1384 with Henning Symons, a farmer of the Free imperial city of Goslar in Lower Saxony, Germany. The family tree begins with Ananias Siemens (ca 1538-1591), a citizen, brewer and owner of an oil mill at Goslar, belonging to the Shoemaker's Guild, as his ancestors were shoemakers.

His grandson Hans (1628–94), speaker of the Merchant's Guild and commander of the town's vigilance committee, built the Siemens House at Goslar in 1692. It is still owned by the family and houses their private archives and an exhibition on the family history. The Siemens family provided numerous members to the Goslar city council as well as four mayors, the last being Johann Georg (1748–1807).

Development

The most important branches of the Goslar family (there are also other families with the same surname in Northern Germany) go back to the farmer Christian Ferdinand Siemens (1787–1840). His sons Werner Siemens (since 1888 von Siemens), (Carl) Wilhelm Siemens (known as Sir William Siemens), Hans Siemens, Friedrich Siemens and Carl (Heinrich) von Siemens became engineers and entrepreneurs.

Werner Siemens, a former artillery and engineering officer in the Prussian army, invented a telegraph that used a needle to point to the right letter, instead of using Morse code. Based on this invention, he founded the company Telegraphen-Bauanstalt von Siemens & Halske on 1 October 1847, with the company taking occupation of its workshop on 12 October. His business partner Johann Georg Halske, a master mechanic, was particularly involved in the construction and design of electrical equipment such as the press which enabled wires to be insulated with a seamless coat of gutta-percha, the pointer telegraph, the morse telegraph and measuring instruments. The company was internationalised soon after its founding. One brother of Werner represented him in England (Sir William Siemens) and another in St.Petersburg, Russia (Carl von Siemens), each earning recognition. In 1867 Mr Halske withdrew from the company because his more conservative views on company policy diverged from those of the rather venturous Siemens brothers.

In 1848, the company built the first long-distance telegraph line in Europe; 500 km from Berlin to Frankfurt am Main. In the 1850s, the company was involved in building long-distance telegraph networks in Russia. In 1867, Siemens completed the monumental Indo-European (Calcutta to London) telegraph line and in 1870 a transatlantic communications cable. In 1857, Werner von Siemens described the countercurrent exchange and in 1867 a dynamo without permanent magnets. A similar system was also independently invented by Charles Wheatstone, but Siemens became the first company to build such devices. In 1881, a Siemens AC Alternator driven by a watermill was used to power the world's first electric street lighting in the town of Godalming, United Kingdom. The company continued to grow and diversified into electric trains and light bulbs. In 1887 it opened its first office in Japan. In 1890, the founder retired and left running the company to his brother Carl and sons Arnold and Wilhelm.

In 1888, Werner Siemens received hereditary ennoblement as von Siemens by Frederick III, German Emperor. His brother William had been knighted – becoming Sir William – by Queen Victoria a few months before his death in 1883. The brother Carl in St. Petersburg was ennobled by Tsar Nicholas II in 1895. Werner's cousin and father-in-law, Carl Georg Siemens (1809–1885), a professor of technology at the University of Hohenheim, received personal ennoblement by the King of Württemberg. Werner's nephew Georg, co-founder of Deutsche Bank, was ennobled by Wilhelm II, German Emperor, in 1899.

Siemens & Halske (S & H) was incorporated in 1897, and then merged parts of its activities with Schuckert & Co., Nuremberg in 1903 to become Siemens-Schuckert. In 1919, S & H and two other companies jointly formed the Osram lightbulb company. During the 1920s and 1930s, S & H started to manufacture radios, television sets, and electron microscopes. In 1932, Reiniger, Gebbert & Schall (Erlangen), Phönix AG (Rudolstadt) and Siemens-Reiniger-Veifa mbH (Berlin) merged to form the Siemens-Reiniger-Werke AG (SRW), a producer of medical technology and the third of the so-called parent companies that Ernst von Siemens decided in 1966 to merge to form the present-day Siemens AG, which is one of the largest electro-technological firms in the world. The company, during all its stages from Siemens & Halske AG, Siemens-Schuckertwerke AG and Siemens-Reiniger-Werke AG until its merger to Siemens AG in 1966, has always been led by subsequent generations of the founder's family, at first by Werner's brother Carl, then by Werner's sons Arnold, Wilhelm and Carl Friedrich, later by his grandsons Hermann and Ernst, and until 1981 by his great-grandson Peter von Siemens.

Today the descendants of Werner and Carl von Siemens have a minority ownership of 6.9% (by comparison: the Ford family controls the Ford Motor Company with a share of 2%), thus still being the largest single shareholder. Based on a market cap of €112billion, the Siemens family holds €7,7 billion worth of common stock in the company and received €201million in dividends in 2016. Considerable parts of this share have been endowed to charitable trusts controlled by family members. The family keeps a seat in the Siemens Supervisory Board and is said to take influence in the background. Until 1981, the chairman of the Supervisory Board has always been a member of the family. The von Siemens are said to return to the chairmanship in the future should necessity require it or an eligible candidate be ready to run. The clan's principal aim has always been to guarantee its 169 years old company independence, stability and solid growth.

Family Members 
 (Ernst) Werner (since 1888) von Siemens (known as Werner) (1816, Gehrden - 1892), inventor, founder of Siemens AG
 (Carl) Wilhelm Siemens (known as (Charles) Wilhelm or Sir William Siemens) (1823, Lenthe - 1883), brother of Werner von Siemens
 Carl (Heinrich) von Siemens (1829, Menzendorf - 1906), brother of Werner von Siemens
 Georg von Siemens (1839 – 1901), banker and politician, nephew of Werner von Siemens
 Alexander Siemens (1847, Hanover - 1928), cousin of Werner von Siemens
 Arnold (since 1888) von Siemens (1853, Berlin - 1918), son of Werner von Siemens
 (Georg) Wilhelm (since 1888) von Siemens (known as Wilhelm) (1855, Berlin - 1919), son of Werner von Siemens
 Carl Friedrich von Siemens (1872, Berlin - 1941), son of Werner von Siemens
 Hermann (Werner) von Siemens (1885, Berlin - 1986), grandson of Werner von Siemens
 Ernst von Siemens (1903, Kingston upon Hull - 1990), grandson of Werner von Siemens
 Peter von Siemens (1911, Berlin - 1986), great-grandson of Werner von Siemens
 Friedrich Siemens (born December 8, 1826 in Menzendorf, † May 24, 1904 in Dresden)

Images

Family Tree

Family Branches

Branch from Ananias Siemens (Founding Father) 
Generations 1-9

Descendants of Christian Ferdinand Siemens (partial excerpt) 
Generations 7–12

(*) Leading function at Siemens & Halske, Siemens Brothers & Co and/or Siemens AG.

Notes

References

 
Prussian nobility
German noble families